The Kingfisher Caper (released as Diamond Hunters in South Africa and as Diamond Lust on video) is a 1975 South African film directed by Dirk DeVilliers for Kavalier Films Ltd. It stars Hayley Mills (as Tracey van der Byl), David McCallum (Benedict van der Byl), Jon Cypher (Johnny Lance), Volente Bertotti (Ruby Lance), Barry Trengove (Cappy) and Bill McNaught (Hendrich van der Byl).

Cast

Main cast
 Hayley Mills as Tracey Van Der Byl
 David McCallum as Benedict Van Der Byl
 Jon Cypher as Johnny Lance
 Barry Trengove as Cappy
 Volenté Bertotti as Ruby Lance
 Bill McNaught as Hendrich Van Der Byl
 Don Furnival as Mac
 Gordon van Rooyen as Kramer
 Stanley Leeshaw as Osaki
 Pieter Geldenhuys as Attorney
 Ray Novak as Joe
 Ian Botha as Sampson

Supporting cast
 Dirk de Villiers as Les (uncredited)

Production
Film rights were bought by Philip Vrasne, who wanted to make it in South Africa.

Kingfisher Caper writer Roy Boulting was married to star Hayley Mills at the time of the filming. This was his final writing credit. 

Filmink magazine called it "typical of several South African movies from the 1970s that attempted to crack the international market (The Shangani Patrol, Funeral for an Assassin, Killer Force, Target of an Assassin, Golden Rendezvous, Game for Vultures): a half-baked action piece with B-list stars (Hayley Mills, David McCallum), iffy handling and one or two decent moments. Roy Boulting, married to Mills at the time, gets a script credit, his last; the film helped kill her career as a movie star."

Remake
It was remade as the 2001 miniseries The Diamond Hunters with Alyssa Milano, Roy Scheider, Sean Patrick Flanery and Michael Easton in the Mills, McNaught, Cypher and McCallum roles respectively; Jolene Blalock, Armin Rohde and Hannes Jaenicke also featured.

References

External links
The Kingfisher Caper at the Internet Movie Database

1975 films
1970s English-language films
English-language South African films
Films set in South Africa
1975 drama films
1970s business films
South African drama films
Films scored by John Dankworth